West Germany (Federal Republic of Germany) competed at the 1980 Winter Olympics in Lake Placid, United States.

Medalists

Alpine skiing

Men

Women

Biathlon

Men

Men's 4 x 7.5 km relay

1A penalty loop of 150 metres had to be skied per missed target. 
2One minute added per close miss (a hit in the outer ring), two minutes added per complete miss.

Bobsleigh

Cross-country skiing

Men

Men's 4 × 10 km relay

Women

Figure skating

Men

Women

Pairs

Ice Dancing

Ice hockey

First round - Blue Division

All times are local (UTC-5).

Team roster
Bernd Englbrecht
Sigmund Suttner
Udo Kiessling
Harald Krüll
Klaus Auhuber
Horst-Peter Kretschmer
Joachim Reil
Peter Scharf
Rainer Philipp
Franz Reindl
Martin Hinterstocker
Uli Egen
Gerd Truntschka
Hans Zach
Hermann Hinterstocker
Ernst Höfner
Vladimir Vacatko
Martin Wild
Holger Meitinger
Head coach: Hans Rampf

Luge

Men

(Men's) Doubles

Women

Nordic combined 

Events:
 normal hill ski jumping (Three jumps, best two counted and shown here.)
 15 km cross-country skiing

Ski jumping

Speed skating

Men

Women

References
Official Olympic Reports
International Olympic Committee results database
 Olympic Winter Games 1980, full results by sports-reference.com

Germany, West
1980
Winter Olympics